Phi Herculis (φ Her) is a binary star system in the northern constellation of Hercules. Based upon an annual parallax shift of 15.99 mas as seen from Earth, it is located around 204 light years from the Sun. With a combined apparent visual magnitude of 4.24, it is bright enough to be seen with the naked eye.

This is a single-lined spectroscopic binary star system with an orbital period of 564.8 days and an eccentricity of 0.526. The primary, component A, is a B-type main sequence star with a stellar classification of B9VspHgMn. It is a chemically peculiar star of the type called a mercury-manganese star. The star is tentatively catalogued as an Alpha2 Canum Venaticorum variable, with brightness variations of just 0.01 magnitudes.

The secondary, component B, was first separated via interferometry in 2004. It is an A-type main sequence star of class A8V.  The magnitude difference between the two components is 2.64.

References

B-type main-sequence stars
A-type main-sequence stars
Spectroscopic binaries
Mercury-manganese stars
Alpha2 Canum Venaticorum variables
Hercules (constellation)
Herculis, Phi
Durchmusterung objects
Herculis, 011
145389
079101
6023